William Samuel Wright   has been Dean of Connor since 2016.

Born in 1959 he was educated at Trinity College, Dublin and ordained in 1988. After a curacy in Belfast  he held incumbencies at Cleenish and Lisburn before his appointment as Dean.

References

Alumni of Trinity College Dublin
Irish Anglicans
Deans of Connor
1959 births
Living people